Susanne Eilersen (born 24 August 1964 in Grenaa) is a Danish politician, who was a member of the Folketing for the Danish People's Party from 2015 to 2019.

Political career
In the 2009 Danish local elections Eilersen was elected in the municipal council of Fredericia Municipality. From 2014 to 2015 she sat in the regional council of Region of Southern Denmark. Her first parliamentary work was as a substitute member of the Folketing from 10 March to 27 May 2015, substituting for Anita Christensen. She was elected into parliament on her own mandate at the 2015 Danish general election. She did not get reelected in 2019. She was a substitute member again from 30 October to 15 November 2019, substituting for Marie Krarup.

References

External links 
 Biography on the website of the Danish Parliament (Folketinget)

Living people
1964 births
People from Norddjurs Municipality
Danish People's Party politicians
Danish municipal councillors
21st-century Danish women politicians
Women members of the Folketing
Members of the Folketing 2015–2019